Georgia Doll (born July 2, 1980 in Vienna) is an Austrian-born German theatre director, playwright and poet.

Life and career 
Georgia Doll was born in 1980 in Vienna. At the age of eight years her parents left Austria and moved to Hamburg. After graduation and her literature and theater studies at the University of Hamburg, she left Hamburg and studied theater in Toulouse, theater directing in Paris and playwriting in Berlin.

2006 her piece Le Pays Sombre is played at the Théatre Ouvert in Paris. Her other plays Miss Europa fährt nach Afrika, Der Hang zum Grundsätzlichen, Der König hat Hunger, Lorenzos Rückkehr, Das blaue Gold, Stranger as well as short pieces were played in France, Germany and Austria, in particular in the cities of Cannes, Marseille, Montluçon, Graz, Vienna, Düsseldorf, Hamburg, at the Staatsschauspiel Dresden, the Munich Kammerspiele and the Maxim Gorki Theatre in Berlin.

In 2006 she also staged Miss Europa fährt nach Afrika in Paris, in 2007 she founded the youth theater troupe "Anyigba Yéyé" in Amlame, Togo, with whom she developed Visite sur Terre and 2008 the Bertolt Brecht play Die Ausnahme und die Regel (2009 on Goethe Institute Lomé) and in 2013 she directed Das blaue Gold in Toulouse. In 2011 Georgia Doll was nominated for the Munich Prize for German language and drama.

Together with director Ida Clay in 2012 she co-directed the short film Der Vogel und die Fenster. In 2013 she worked together with the actor and director Philip Baumgarten in an artist residency at the Marelle villa des Auteurs in the Friche de la Belle de Mai in Marseille for their production Sous le sixieme soleil, that has been sent in April of the same year in the Radio Grenouille in Marseille.

As part of the author inside workshop out - new German pieces -, a cooperation of cultural and lifestyle publication freitext, Ballhaus Naunynstraße and the Ensemble of the Maxim Gorki Theatrein Berlin, her play ich waren wir wir waren ich was shown at the studio Я of the Maxim Gorki Theatre and in the Ballhaus Naunynstraße.

Since 2012 she works in Marseille with her company Les Passagers du Mardi.

Georgia Doll writes both in German and in French. In 2002 she published lyrical texts in the series Junge Lyrik in the Martin Werhand Verlag. In 2010 she was published in the anthology Zwischenspiele: Neue Texte, Wahrnehmungs- und Fiktionsräume in Theater, Tanz und Performance in the transcript Verlag. In 2013 she published her bilingual play Das blaue Gold: L'or bleu in the Drei Masken Verlag.

Awards 
 2011: Nomination for the Münchner Förderpreis für deutsche Sprache und Dramatik

Publications (selection)

Books 
 Das blaue Gold: L'or bleu, Drei Masken Verlag, Toulouse: Presses Univ. du Mirailm, 2013,

Anthologies (selection) 
 Junge Lyrik III - 50 Dichterinnen und Dichter. Anthology, Martin Werhand Verlag, Melsbach 2002, . Also second, revised edition. (edited by Martin Werhand)
 Zwischenspiele: Neue Texte, Wahrnehmungs- und Fiktionsräume in Theater, Tanz und Performance. Anthology, transcript Verlag, Bielefeld, 2010,

Literature 
 Georgia Doll. In:  - Das blaue Gold: L'or bleu, Drei Masken Verlag, 2013

See also

External links 
 
 Georgia Doll in: Maxim Gorki Theater 
 Georgia Doll in: Staatsschauspiel Dresden 
 Georgia Doll in: Münchner Kammerspiele

References 

1980 births
Living people
German theatre directors
German women dramatists and playwrights
21st-century German dramatists and playwrights
21st-century German poets
Austrian emigrants to Germany
German women poets
21st-century German women writers